Tim Coremans (born 10 April 1991) is a Dutch football player who plays for Sparta Rotterdam in the Dutch Eredivisie.

Club career
He made his professional debut in the Eerste Divisie for FC Dordrecht on 5 August 2016 in a game against FC Oss.

References

External links
 
 
 Career stats & Profile - Voetbal International

1991 births
Living people
Footballers from Breda
Association football goalkeepers
Dutch footballers
NAC Breda players
SC Cambuur players
ADO Den Haag players
FC Dordrecht players
Sparta Rotterdam players
Eredivisie players
Eerste Divisie players